Joyce Selznick (February 12, 1925 – September 17, 1981) was a talent agent, casting director, and screenwriter. She was the niece of film producer David O. Selznick (Gone with the Wind, 1939), providing her with early exposure to the industry. Her career spanned three decades and began with her discovery of a New York truck driver named Bernie Schwartz whom she developed him into a matinee idol and future actor Tony Curtis. and climaxed with the casting of The Buddy Holly Story, released in 1978. Her work ended with her premature death in 1981 at age 56 from breast cancer.

Career

Born in Pittsburgh, Pennsylvania, Joyce Selznick was raised in the Hollywood culture. In the late 1940s, she discovered New York truck driver Bernie Schwartz, who became actor Tony Curtis.

She discovered James Darren around 1955 when he was about 19, recognizing his talent when he contacted her based on the recommendation of a photographer's secretary, Yvonne Bouvier, in 1959. Darren recalls:"I was studying acting in New York City with Stella Adler. I'd been studying with her for a couple of years...[Yvonne Bouvier] set up a meeting between me and Joyce Selznick, who worked for Screen Gems. I went down to 1650 Broadway, the Brill Building. On my way to [the] meeting with Joyce, we just happened to get on the elevator at the same time. She kept staring at me. I never met her. She never met me. We got off at the same floor and walked to the same office. That was our meeting. Joyce brought me over to Columbia Pictures about a week later and got me a contract there."

Darren was cast in Rumble on the Docks, released in 1956, and after receiving hundreds of fan letters for a non-lead role, his casting and fame continued to flourish.

While working as the eastern talent scout for Colpix Records, a division of Columbia Pictures in 1959, she signed the emerging pianist/singer Nina Simone. Colpix released nine albums for Simone.

Selznick eventually did casting work for films, including 1978's The Buddy Holly Story. She was responsible for selecting Gary Busey to play Holly, in what was an Oscar-nominated performance. 

Critics praised Busey's singing and acting, the recognizing of talent in both being something in which Selznick was experienced. Selznick served as the casting director for 13 films during her career and was a screenwriter for three other films.

Death
Selznick was diagnosed with breast cancer, which claimed her life on September 17, 1981 in Hollywood, California.

In the 1988 TV movie The Ann Jillian Story, Selznick was portrayed by Pam Hyatt.

References

External links
 

American casting directors
Women casting directors
Businesspeople from Pittsburgh
1925 births
1981 deaths
20th-century American businesspeople